Azacualpa is a town, with a population of 10,470 (2020 calculation), and a municipality in the Honduran department of Santa Bárbara, known for its coffee production.

Demographics
At the time of the 2013 Honduras census, Azacualpa municipality had a population of 20,210. Of these, 93.62% were Mestizo, 5.15% White, 0.59% Indigenous, 0.50% Black or Afro-Honduran and 0.14% others.

References

Municipalities of the Santa Bárbara Department, Honduras